The ceremonial county of Bedfordshire (which comprises Bedford, Central Bedfordshire and Luton unitary authorities) is split into 6 seats – 3 borough and 3 county constituencies.

Constituencies

2010 boundary changes 
Under the Fifth Periodic Review of Westminster constituencies, the Boundary Commission for England decided to retain Bedfordshire's constituencies for the 2010 election, making minor changes to realign constituency boundaries with the boundaries of current local government wards, and to reduce the electoral disparity between constituencies.

Proposed boundary changes 
See 2023 Periodic Review of Westminster constituencies for further details.

Following the abandonment of the Sixth Periodic Review (the 2018 review), the Boundary Commission for England formally launched the 2023 Review on 5 January 2021. Initial proposals were published on 8 June 2021 and, following two periods of public consultation, revised proposals were published on 8 November 2022. Final proposals will be published by 1 July 2023.

The commission has proposed that Bedfordshire be combined with Hertfordshire as a sub-region of the Eastern Region, with the creation of the cross-county boundary constituency of Hitchin. As a result of the changes, Luton South would be renamed Luton South and South Bedfordshire, North East Bedfordshire renamed North Bedfordshire, and South West Bedfordshire renamed Dunstable and Leighton Buzzard. The following seats are proposed:

Containing electoral wards in Bedford
Bedford
Mid Bedfordshire (part)
North Bedfordshire (part)
Containing electoral wards in Central Bedfordshire
Dunstable and Leighton Buzzard
Hitchin (part also in the District of North Hertfordshire)
Luton South and South Bedfordshire (part)
Mid Bedfordshire (part)
North Bedfordshire (part)
Containing electoral wards in Luton

Luton North
Luton South and South Bedfordshire (part)

Results history
Primary data source: House of Commons research briefing – General election results from 1918 to 2019

2019 
The number of votes cast for each political party who fielded candidates in constituencies comprising Bedfordshire in the 2019 general election were as follows:

Percentage votes 

1Includes National Liberal Party up to 1966

21950–1979 – Liberal; 1983 & 1987 – SDP-Liberal Alliance

* Included in Other

Seats 

1Includes National Liberal Party up to 1966

Maps

Timeline

Historical representation by party 
A cell marked → (with a different colour background to the preceding cell) indicates that the previous MP continued to sit under a new party name.

1802 to 1837

1837 to 1885

1885 to 1918

1918 to 1974

1974 to present

See also
List of parliamentary constituencies in the East of England (region)
History of parliamentary constituencies and boundaries in Bedfordshire

Notes

References

 
Bedfordshire
Bedfordshire
Bedfordshire-related lists